This is a list of intersex characters in fiction, i.e. fictional characters that either self-identify as intersex or have been identified by outside parties to be intersex. Listed characters are either recurring characters, cameos, guest stars, or one-off characters.

For more information about fictional characters in other parts of the LGBTQ community, see the lists of lesbian (with sub-pages for characters in anime and animation), bisexual (with sub-sections for characters in anime and animation), gay, non-binary, trans, pansexual, and asexual characters.

The names are organized alphabetically by surname (i.e. last name), or by single name if the character does not have a surname. If more than two characters are in one entry, the last name of the first character is used.

Animation and anime

Comics and manga

Film

Literature

Live-action television

See also 
 Films about intersex
 Literature about intersex
 Television works about intersex
 List of intersex people
 List of fictional polyamorous characters
 List of animated series with LGBT characters
 Lists of LGBT figures in fiction and myth
 List of animated series with crossdressing characters

References

Citations

Sources

 

 
Intersex
Intersex-related lists